Harmozica ravergiensis is a species of an air-breathing land snail, a terrestrial pulmonate gastropod mollusk in the family Hygromiidae, the hairy snails and their allies.

This is the type species of the genus Harmozica.

The specific name ravergiensis is in honour of Mr. M. Ravergie.

Distribution 
The distribution of this species is Caucasian and countries include:
 probably non-native in Ukraine.
 southeastern Ukraine in Dnipropetrovsk Oblast and Donetsk Oblast since 2006
 western Ukraine
 Armenia
 Azerbaijan
 Georgia
 Russia

The type locality is "Caucasus".

Description 
The shape of the shell of Harmozica ravergiensis is globose.

References

Hygromiidae
Gastropods described in 1835